Pipeworks Brewing Company is a brewery in Chicago, Illinois. The brewery opened in January 2012 by founders Beejay Oslon and Gerrit Lewis. Pipeworks began their brewing different from other microbreweries in that they initially brewed their beers entirely as a series of 'one off' beers that were aimed specifically to the niche market of beer connoisseurs. The brewery's stated goal is to release a new beer every week. This approach gave the brewery and its beers somewhat of a cult status among beer enthusiasts, with its offerings selling out relatively quickly. After seeing significant growth, both in output brand and identity, Pipeworks has since augmented their one-off beers with several of its 'core' beers in 16 ounce can 4-Packs now regularly available widely throughout the Chicago area.

History
Pipeworks began as the brainchild of Oslon and Lewis, who were homebrewers that met while working at West Lakeview Liquors in Chicago. The two were educated in larger scale brewing at the De Struise Brewery in Oostvleteren, Belgium. In 2011, the pair began an online fundraising campaign to raise the capital needed to build the brewery, which would be located in Chicago's Bucktown neighborhood. Oslon and Lewis planned specifically to build a smaller brewery that veered from the conventional course followed by most commercial breweries: they would not make the same exact beer twice. This concept, which is known in the industry as gypsy brewing,  became conceptualized as somewhat of a hybrid at the fledgling brewery, that style of brewing is usually done on borrowed equipment. The duo also took an unorthodox approach in the building of the brewery, raising over $30,000 (USD) through internet donations via Kickstarter. In late January, 2013, Pipeworks was awarded RateBeer's 'Best New Brewery' distinction for 2012.

In June, 2015, Pipeworks purchased a larger facility in the West Side, 3912 W. McLean Ave., near Pulaski Road and Armitage Avenue. They planned to move production to both bottling and canning. Their original facility has since been vacated and is set to be demolished to make way for condominiums.

Beer

See also
 Barrel-aged beer

References

External links
 Pipeworks Brewing Co. official website

Beer brewing companies based in Chicago
Manufacturing companies based in Chicago
American beer brands
Food and drink companies established in 2012